Nu'uausala is a Samoan surname. Notable people with the surname include:

Annetta Nu'uausala (born 1995), New Zealand rugby league footballer, sister of Frank-Paul
Frank-Paul Nu'uausala (born 1987), New Zealand rugby league footballer

Samoan-language surnames